Francisco Guanco (born 11 December 1964) is a Filipino swimmer. He competed in two events at the 1984 Summer Olympics.

References

1964 births
Living people
Filipino male swimmers
Olympic swimmers of the Philippines
Swimmers at the 1984 Summer Olympics
Place of birth missing (living people)
Male breaststroke swimmers